The Sigma-D relation, or Σ-D Relation, is the radio surface brightness to diameter relation of a supernova remnant.

See also 
Cosmic distance ladder
Faber–Jackson relation
M–sigma relation

References 

Physical cosmology
Astrophysics
Equations of astronomy